Adesmia is a genus of flowering plants in the legume family, Fabaceae. It was recently assigned to the informal monophyletic Adesmia clade within the Dalbergieae.

Species
Adesmia comprises the following species:

 Adesmia aconcaguensis Burkart
 Adesmia acuta Burkart

 Adesmia adrianii M.N. Correa
 Adesmia aegiceras Phil.

 Adesmia ameghinoi Speg.

 Adesmia aphanantha Speg.
 Adesmia aphylla Clos

 Adesmia arachnipes Clos
 Adesmia araucana Phil.
 Adesmia araujoi Burkart

 Adesmia arenicola (R.E. Fr.) Burkart
 Adesmia argentea Meyen
 Adesmia argyrophylla Phil.
 Adesmia arillata Miotto
 Adesmia aromatica Burkart

 Adesmia aspera Hook. & Arn.
 Adesmia atacamensis Phil.
 Adesmia atuelensis Burkart
 Adesmia aucaensis Burkart
 Adesmia aueri Burkart
 Adesmia augustii J.F. Macbr.
 Adesmia aurantiaca (Dusen) Burkart
 Adesmia axillaris Phil.
 Adesmia balsamica Colla
 Adesmia bedwellii Skottsb.

 Adesmia bicolor (Poir.) DC.
 Adesmia bijuga Phil.
 Adesmia boelckeana Burkart
 Adesmia bonariensis Burkart
 Adesmia boronioides Hook. f.

 Adesmia brachysemeon Phil.
 Adesmia bracteata Hook. & Arn.
 Adesmia brevivexillata Burkart
 Adesmia burkartii M.N. Correa
 Adesmia cabrerae Burkart
 Adesmia caespitosa Phil.

 Adesmia calycicomosa Burkart

 Adesmia candida Hook. f.
 Adesmia canescens Phil.
 Adesmia capitellata (Clos) Hauman

 Adesmia ciliata Vogel

 Adesmia codonocalyx G.F. Grandjot
 Adesmia colinensis Phil.
 Adesmia coluteoides Hook. & Arn.

 Adesmia concinna Phil.
 Adesmia conferta Hook. & Arn.
 Adesmia confusa Ulibarri
 Adesmia coquimbensis Burkart
 Adesmia cordobensis Burkart
 Adesmia coronilloides Hook. & Arn.
 Adesmia corymbosa Clos
 Adesmia crassicaulis Phil.
 Adesmia cuneata Mey. ex Vog.
 Adesmia curvifolia Clos
 Adesmia cytisoides Griseb.
 Adesmia darapskyana Phil.
 Adesmia davilae Phil.

 Adesmia denticulata Clos
 Adesmia denudata Phil.

 Adesmia dessaueri (Reiche) Ulibarri

 Adesmia dichotoma Clos
 Adesmia digitata Burkart
 Adesmia disperma Phil.

 Adesmia dumosa Phil.
 Adesmia echinus C. Presl
 Adesmia elata Clos
 Adesmia elegans Clos

 Adesmia emarginata Clos
 Adesmia eremophila Phil.
 Adesmia erinacea Phil.
 Adesmia exilis Clos
 Adesmia fabrisii Burkart

 Adesmia filicaulis Phil.
 Adesmia filifolia Clos
 Adesmia filipes A. Gray
 Adesmia friesii Ulibarri
 Adesmia frigida Phil.
 Adesmia fuentesii G.F. Grandjot

 Adesmia gayana Phil.

 Adesmia germainii Phil.

 Adesmia glandulifera (Rendle) Skottsb.

 Adesmia glauca Phil.
 Adesmia glaucescens Phil.
 Adesmia glomerula Clos
 var. australior Burkart
 var. glomerula Clos
 Adesmia glutinosa Hook. & Arn.
 Adesmia godoyae Reiche
 Adesmia gracilis Vogel
 Adesmia gracillima I.M. Johnst.
 Adesmia graminidea Speg.
 Adesmia grandiflora Gillies

 Adesmia guttulifera Sandwith

 Adesmia hemisphaerica Hauman

 Adesmia hirsuta Phil.
 Adesmia hispidula (Lag.) DC.
 Adesmia horrida Hook. & Arn.

 Adesmia hunzikeri Burkart
 Adesmia hystrix Phil.
 Adesmia incana Vogel
 Adesmia inconspicua Phil.

 Adesmia jilesiana Burkart

 Adesmia kingii Phil.
 Adesmia lanata Hook. f.

 Adesmia latifolia (Spreng.) Vogel

 Adesmia laxa Clos
 Adesmia leiocarpa Hook. & Arn.

 Adesmia leptobotrys Burkart

 Adesmia lihuelensis Burkart
 Adesmia littoralis Burkart
 Adesmia longipes Phil.
 Adesmia longiseta DC.
 Adesmia lotoides Hook. f.
 Adesmia loudonia Hook. & Arn.
 Adesmia macrostachya Benth.
 Adesmia medinae (Reiche) Ulibarri

 Adesmia melanocaulos Phil.
 Adesmia melanthes Phil.
 Adesmia mendozana Ulibarri

 Adesmia micrantha Phil.
 Adesmia microcalyx Phil.
 Adesmia microphylla Hook. & Arn.
 Adesmia minor (Hook. & Arn.) Burkart
 Adesmia miraflorensis J. Remy
 Adesmia monosperma Clos
 Adesmia montana Phil.

 Adesmia mucronata Hook. & Arn.
 Adesmia multicuspis Clos
 Adesmia muricata (Jacq.) DC.
 Adesmia nana (Chodat & Wilczek) Hauman
 Adesmia nanolignea Burkart
 Adesmia neglecta M.N. Correa

 Adesmia nordenskioldii (R.E. Fr.) Cardenas
 Adesmia obcordata Clos
 Adesmia obovata Clos
 Adesmia obscura Clos
 Adesmia occulta (R.E. Fr.) Burkart
 Adesmia odontophylla Phil.

 Adesmia pampeana Speg.
 Adesmia papposa (Lag.) DC.
 Adesmia paranensis Burkart
 Adesmia parviflora Clos
 Adesmia parvifolia Phil.

 Adesmia patagonica Speg.
 Adesmia patancana Ulbr.
 Adesmia pauciflora Vogel
 Adesmia pearcei Phil.
 Adesmia pedicellata Hook. & Arn.

 Adesmia pentaphylla Phil.
 Adesmia peraltae (Reiche) Ulibarri

 Adesmia phylloidea Clos
 Adesmia pinifolia Hook. & Arn.
 Adesmia pirionii I.M. Johnst.

 Adesmia polygaloides (Chodat) Burkart
 Adesmia polyphylla Phil.
 Adesmia propinqua Clos
 Adesmia prostrata Clos
 Adesmia pseudincana Burkart
 Adesmia pseudogrisea Burkart

 Adesmia psoraleoides Vogel

 Adesmia pumahuasiana Ulibarri
 Adesmia pumila Hook. f.
 Adesmia punctata (Poir.) DC.
 Adesmia pungens Clos
 Adesmia pusilla Phil.

 Adesmia quadripinnata (Hicken) Burkart

 Adesmia radicifolia Clos
 Adesmia ragonesei Burkart
 Adesmia rahmeri Phil.
 Adesmia ramosissima Phil.
 Adesmia reclinata O. Muniz
 Adesmia reitziana Burkart

 Adesmia renjifoana (Reiche) Ulibarri

 Adesmia resinosa Phil.
 Adesmia retrofracta Hook. & Arn.
 Adesmia retusa Griseb.

 Adesmia riojana Burkart
 Adesmia rocinhensis Burkart
 Adesmia rubroviridis Burkart
 Adesmia ruiz-lealii M.N. Correa

 Adesmia salamancensis Burkart
 Adesmia salicornioides Speg.
 Adesmia sandwithii Burkart
 Adesmia sanjuanensis Burkart
 Adesmia schickendanztii Griseb.
 Adesmia schneideri Phil.
 Adesmia securigerifolia Herter

 Adesmia serrana M.N. Correa

 Adesmia sessiliflora Phil.
 Adesmia silvestrii Speg.

 Adesmia smithiae DC.

 Adesmia spinosissima Vogel
 Adesmia spuma Burkart
 Adesmia stenocaulon Hauman

 Adesmia subnuda (A. Gray) Burkart
 Adesmia subsericea (Chodat & Wilczek) Hauman
 Adesmia subterranea Clos

 Adesmia suffocata Hook. f.
 Adesmia tehuelcha Speg.
 Adesmia tenella Hook. & Arn.

 Adesmia tomentosa Meyen
 Adesmia torcae Phil.
 Adesmia trifoliata Phil.
 Adesmia trifoliolata Hook. & Arn.
 Adesmia trijuga Hook. & Arn.
 Adesmia tristis Vogel
 Adesmia tucumanensis Burkart
 Adesmia tunuianica Burkart

 Adesmia unifoliolata Skottsb.

 Adesmia uspallatensis Hook. & Arn.

 Adesmia verrucosa Meyen

 Adesmia villosa Hook. f.
 Adesmia virens Phil.

 Adesmia viscida Savi
 Adesmia viscidissima Johnston
 Adesmia viscosa Hook. & Arn.
 Adesmia volckmannii Phil.
 Adesmia zoellneri Ulibarri

References

 
Fabaceae genera